Avalon is an unincorporated community and census-designated place in Santa Rosa County, Florida, United States. Its population was 679 as of the 2010 census. Interstate 10 passes through the community.

Geography
It is known to have a rainy climate starting in the months of May and June and ending in October. The average temp is around 70°f or 21°c. The land contains small hills and small ponds.

Demographics

References

Unincorporated communities in Santa Rosa County, Florida
Unincorporated communities in Florida
Census-designated places in Santa Rosa County, Florida
Census-designated places in Florida